XEMX-AM is a radio station on 1120 AM in Mexicali, Baja California, Mexico. It is a news/talk station and forms part of the city's MVS Radio cluster.

History
XEMX received its concession on May 18, 1988. It was owned by Carlos Armando Madrazo y Pintado and sold to Sociedad Mexicana de Radio de Baja California in 1999. SOMER Baja California was folded into MVS proper in 2012. While MVS operated few AM stations in general (it was an early adopter of FM), it had an outsized cluster in Mexicali, consisting of XHJC-FM 91.5, XHPF-FM 101.9, XHVG-FM 103.3, XHCMS-FM 105.5, XEMVS-AM 820 and XEMX. XHCMS and XEMVS (now XHABCA) were sold in 2004.

References

External links
XEMX-AM on Facebook

1988 establishments in Mexico
MVS Radio
News and talk radio stations in Mexico
Radio stations established in 1988
Radio stations in Mexicali